The 2002 Barnet Council election took place on 2 May 2002 to elect members of Barnet London Borough Council in London, England. The whole council was up for election and the Conservative party gained overall control of the council, replacing the Labour-Liberal Democrat coalition that had governed Barnet for the previous 8 years.

Background
Before the election a Labour-Liberal Democrat coalition ran the council. Since the last election in 1998, the Local Government Commission carried out a periodic electoral review of Barnet under the Local Government Act 1992 and made a number of boundary changes increasing the number of seats by three.

Election result
Overall turnout in the election was 34.04%.

|}

Ward results

Brunswick Park

Burnt Oak

Childs Hill

Colindale

Coppetts

East Barnet

East Finchley

Edgware

Finchley Church End

Garden Suburb

Golders Green

Hale

Hendon

High Barnet

Mill Hill

Oakleigh

Totteridge

Underhill

West Finchley

West Hendon

Woodhouse

By-elections between 2002 and 2006

Burnt Oak

The by-election was called following the resignation of Cllr. Alan J. Williams.

Hale

The by-election was called following the resignation of Cllr. Ruth J. Nyman.

Colindale

The by-election was called following the disqualification of Cllr. Alan M. Sloam.

Garden Suburb

The by-election was called following the resignation of Cllr. Vanessa R. Gearson.

High Barnet

The by-election was called following the resignation of Cllr. Kantilal S. Patel in October 2005. It was only the third time in the council's history that a seat had changed hands in a by-election.

References

2002
2002 London Borough council elections